Re-Entry is the second album by the Illbient band Techno Animal, released on 20 June 1995 through Virgin Records.

Track listing

Personnel
Techno Animal
Justin Broadrick – production
Kevin Martin – production
Additional musicians and production
Damian Bennette – bass guitar on "Cape Canaveral"
Kingsuk Biswas – synthesizer on "Narco Agent vs. The Medicine Man"
Dave Cochrane – bass guitar on "Needle Park"
Tony Cousins – mastering
Jon Hassell – trumpet on "Flight of the Hermaphrodite" and "Needle Park"
The Pathological Puppy – illustrations, design
Tom Prentice – viola on "Demodex Invasion"

References

1995 albums
Techno Animal albums
Virgin Records albums
Albums produced by Justin Broadrick